Saikhan-Ovoo is an urban-type settlement or village in Saikhan sum (district) of Bulgan Province in northern Mongolia.

The population of Saikhan-Ovoo is 500 (or 124 households) (end of 2006).

Geography 
 west of Bulgan city, the capital of Bulgan Province.

Climate

Saikhan-Ovoo has a cold desert climate (Köppen climate classification BWk) with warm summers and very cold winters. Most precipitation falls in the summer as rain. Winters are very dry.

Economy 
Saikhan-Ovoo coal mine has estimated coal resources of up to 190 million tonnes.

References 

Populated places in Mongolia